Oligobombus is an extinct genus of bumblebee relatives in the tribe Bombini, containing the single species Oligobombus cuspidatus.  The genus and species were described by Antropov (2014) based on a single fore-wing from the Late Eocene Bembridge Marls Insect Bed on the Isle of Wight, England. The fossil was described by re-examining a specimen in the Smith Collection. The collection was originally made by A'Court Smith, and purchased by the Natural History Museum in 1877 and 1883.

References 

†
Eocene insects
Fossil bee taxa
Priabonian life
Prehistoric insects of Europe
Paleogene England
Fossils of England
Fossil taxa described in 2014
†